Wiskott–Aldrich syndrome protein family member 1, also known as WASP-family verprolin homologous protein 1 (WAVE1), is a protein that in humans is encoded by the WASF1 gene.

Function 

The protein encoded by this gene, a member of the Wiskott–Aldrich syndrome protein (WASP) family, plays a critical role downstream of Rac, a Rho-family small GTPase, through its involvement in the WAVE regulatory complex in regulating the actin cytoskeleton required for membrane ruffling. It has been shown to associate with an actin nucleation core Arp2/3 complex while enhancing actin polymerization in vitro.

Clinical significance 

Wiskott–Aldrich syndrome is a disease of the immune system, likely due to defects in regulation of actin cytoskeleton.

Interactions
WASF1 has been shown to interact with BAIAP2 and Profilin 1.

References

Further reading